Phu Pha Thoep National Park, formerly known as Mukdahan National Park, is a national park in Mukdahan Province, Thailand. This park, one of the country's smallest national parks, is home to unusual rock formations and a cave with ancient hand paintings.

Geography
The park's area is 30,245 rai ~ .

History
Phu Pha Thoep National Park is home to a cave with hand paintings estimated to be 3,000 to 5,000 years old. The cave name, Tham Fa Mue Daeng, means "red hand", referring to the red colour of the paintings.

Attractions
Phu Tam Pra is a mainly seasonal waterfall. Above this waterfall is a cave grotto housing a three-foot wide Buddha image along with hundreds of smaller wooden Buddha images and animal models.

The park's namesake mountain Phu Pha Thoep hosts a complex of rocks in eroded formations thought to resemble mushrooms, temples, swans etc. The viewpoint atop Phu Mano affords views of Mukdahan city, the Mekong river and neighbouring Laos.

Flora and fauna
The park features forest types including mixed and deciduous. Tree species include Afzelia xylocarpa, Anisoptera costata, Dalbergia cochinchinensis, Dalbergia oliveri, Irvingia malayana, Lagerstroemia calyculata, Pterocarpus macrocarpus, Shorea roxburghii, Shorea obtusa, Shorea siamensis, Toona ciliata and Dalbergia obtusifolia. Various species of Dillenia, Barringtonia and Cratoxylum are also present.

Animals in the park include northern pig-tailed macaque, sambar deer, golden jackal, common palm civet, northern red muntjac (Muntiacus muntjak vaginalis) and wild boar. The park's many birds include junglefowl, green peafowl and pheasant. In 2005, specimens of a new frog species, Fejervarya triora, were discovered in the park.

See also
List of national parks of Thailand
List of Protected Areas Regional Offices of Thailand

References

National parks of Thailand
Geography of Mukdahan province
Tourist attractions in Mukdahan province